Marc Ferracci (born 19 December 1977) is a French politician from La République En Marche! who has served as the member of the National Assembly for the 6th constituency for French residents overseas.

See also 

 List of deputies of the 16th National Assembly of France

References 

1977 births
Living people
21st-century French politicians
Deputies of the 16th National Assembly of the French Fifth Republic
Members of Parliament for French people living outside France
La République En Marche! politicians
People from Les Lilas
French people of Italian descent
HEC Paris alumni